was a town located in Kashima District, Ishikawa Prefecture, Japan. On March 1, 2005, Kashima was merged with the towns of Rokusei and Toriya (all from Kashima District) to create the town of Nakanoto. As of 2003 the town had an estimated population of 8,515, a density of 178.96 persons per km², and a total area 47.58 km².

External links
 Official website of Nakanoto in Japanese

Dissolved municipalities of Ishikawa Prefecture
Nakanoto, Ishikawa